Julstämning is a 1990 Christmas album by Loa Falkman. The album was rereleased in 1995.

Track listing
Betlehems stjärna (Gläns över sjö och strand) – Alice Tegnér, Viktor Rydberg
Psaltarpsalm, nr 24 (Davids psalm, nr 24) (Gören portarna höga) – Gunnar Wennerberg
När det lider mot jul (Det strålar en stjärna) – Ruben Liljefors, Jeanna Oterdahl
Panis angelicus – C. Franck
Stilla natt (Stille Nacht, Heilige Nacht) – Franz Gruber
Julsång (Cantique de Noel) – Adolphe Adam
Frid på jorden – Billy Butt, Ingela Forsman
Jag drömmer om en jul hemma (White Christmas) – Irving Berlin, Karl-Lennart
It's Christmas in New York – Billy Butt
Låt mig få tända ett ljus (Schlafe mein Prinzchen) – B. Flies, B. Carlsson
I'll Be Home for Christmas – (Kim Gannon, Walter Kent, Buck Ram)
Julstämning – Lasse Holm, Ingela Forsman

Contributors
Peter Ljung – piano, synthesizer
Bengt Forsberg – organ
Hasse Rosén, Lasse Wellander – guitar
Sam Bengtsson – bass

References

1990 Christmas albums
Christmas albums by Swedish artists
Loa Falkman albums